Kumane is a village in municipality of Istočni Stari Grad, Republika Srpska, Bosnia and Herzegovina.

Notable people
Platon of Banja Luka

References

Populated places in Istočni Stari Grad
Villages in Republika Srpska